Har Sharma (8 December 1922 – 12 November 1992) was an Indian cricket umpire. He stood in three Test matches between 1974 and 1977.

See also
 List of Test cricket umpires

References

1922 births
1992 deaths
People from Delhi
Indian Test cricket umpires